Sultan Muhammad was a Persian painter at the Safavid court at Tabriz under Shah Ismail I and Shah Tahmasp I. He served as the director of Shah Ismail's artists’ workshop and as the first project director of the Shahnameh of Shah Tahmasp. He gave painting lessons to Tahmasp when he was the crown prince.

Sultan Muhammad’s style was initially based in the Turkman courtly idiom. Sheila R. Canby writes that around 1515, he was perfecting scenes of “man and animal inhabiting a natural world of roaring winds, lush and frenzied vegetation and rocks resembling grotesque faces”, of which his painting “Rustam Sleeping while Rakhsh Fights a Lion” from an unfinished Shahnameh is an example. In the 1520s however, Sultan Muhammad was influenced by the more sedate and subtle late Timurid mode practiced at Herat; his compositions became more orderly and architectonic.

Sultan Muhammad’s painting “The Court of Gayumars” is widely considered the “crowning achievement” of the Shahnameh of Shah Tahmasp. It has been estimated that the artist worked on the painting for three years. In 1544, Dust Muhammad described it as “such that the lion-hearted of the jungle of depiction and the leopards and crocodiles of the workshop of ornamentation quail at the fangs of his pen and bend their necks before the awesomeness of his pictures,” making it one of the few individual paintings to be referenced in any sixteenth century text.

Other than the Shahnameh of Shah Tahmasp, Sultan Muhammad may have contributed to an illustrated manuscript of the Story of Jamal and Jalal of Muhammad Asafi that was copied by the scribe Sultan Ali Qayini in 1502–3 at Herat but then travelled west. He was also among the few distinguished artists to contribute to an illustrated manuscript of the Khamseh of Nizami that was copied by the scribe Shah Mahmud of Nishapur at Tabriz and produced between 1539 and 1543. Furthermore, he decorated the borders of many other fine Safavid manuscripts.

Sultan Muhammad was a native of Tabriz. He was the father of the artist Mirza Ali, who also contributed to the Shahnameh of Shah Tahmasp, and the grandfather of the painter and illuminator Mir Zayn al-'Abidin, who was active in the last quarter of the sixteenth century. He died before 1555.

References

Persian miniature painters
16th-century Iranian painters